Cerro Planada is a mountain peak located in Cayey, Puerto Rico. The mountain has an elevation of 2,480 feet (755 m), making it the 10th highest peak of the Sierra de Cayey.

Cerro Planada is located in the boundary between the barrios (districts) of Lapa and Pasto Viejo. The mountain forms part of the Planadas-Yeyesa Nature Reserve, located in the municipalities of Cayey and Salinas.

See also 
 Sierra de Cayey

References 

Mountains of Puerto Rico
Protected areas of Puerto Rico